Artigues is a commune in the Hautes-Pyrénées department in southwestern France.

It is a small village retaining traditional architecture of the region. The commune is at the end of a steep dead-end road from the outskirts of Luchon.

Geography

Climate

Artigues has a oceanic climate (Köppen climate classification Cfb).

Population

See also
Communes of the Hautes-Pyrénées department

References

Communes of Hautes-Pyrénées